Poquitos is a Mexican restaurant in with three locations in the U.S. state of Washington. The original restaurant is located in Seattle's Capitol Hill neighborhood, at the intersection of 10th and Pike. Locations have subsequently opened in Bothell (2018) and Tacoma (2022).

Description 
In 2016 and 2017, the Not for Tourists Guide to Seattle described the restaurant as "accessible, authentic Mexican using high-quality ingredients".

History 
The restaurant was opened by restaurateurs Deming Maclise and James Weimann in 2011, and its operating owners were Matt Fundingsland and Dustin Watson, as of 2014.

In 2017, owners announced plans to open a second location in Bothell. The restaurant opened in 2018. 

A third location opened in Tacoma in 2022.

Reception 
Allecia Vermillion included the restaurant in Seattle Metropolitan's 2021 list of "The Best Restaurants on Capitol Hill".

See also 

 List of Mexican restaurants

References

External links

 
 
 Poquitos at The Stranger
 Poquitos at Zagat

2011 establishments in Washington (state)
Bothell, Washington
Capitol Hill, Seattle
Culture of Tacoma, Washington
Mexican restaurants in Seattle
Mexican restaurants in Washington (state)
Restaurants established in 2011